The Parti républicain du Québec (PRQ, n English: Quebec Republican Party) was a political party that advocated the independence of Quebec from Canada. The PRQ was founded in November 1962 by Marcel Chaput, who was also one of the founders of the Rassemblement pour l'indépendance nationale in 1960.

At the time, the RIN was not a political party, only a political movement, and the executive had refused to run candidates in elections. Chaput believed that independentist movement should run candidates in general elections. He had run in the 1962 Quebec election as an unaffiliated candidate. Shortly after the election, he founded the PRQ. Quickly, the party was plagued by financial problems, and it never achieved the goal of gathering all the sovereigntist forces. The Parti républicain du Québec folded in 1964 without contesting a single election. The same year, the Rassemblement pour l'indépendance nationale decided to become a political party.

See also

 Politics of Quebec
 List of Quebec general elections
 List of Quebec premiers
 List of Quebec leaders of the Opposition
 National Assembly of Quebec
 Timeline of Quebec history
 Political parties in Quebec
 Sovereigntist events and strategies
 Quebec nationalism
 Quebec Sovereignism

External links
 National Assembly historical information
 La Politique québécoise sur le Web
 History of the Parti républicain du Québec (in French)

Provincial political parties in Quebec
Political parties established in 1962
Political parties established in 1964
Defunct secessionist organizations in Canada
Defunct political parties in Canada
1962 establishments in Quebec